Guadalupe is a district of the Zarcero canton, in the Alajuela province of Costa Rica.

Geography 
Guadalupe has an area of  km² and an elevation of  metres.

Locations
 Poblados (villages): Anateri, Bellavista, Morelos

Demographics 

For the 2011 census, Guadalupe had a population of  inhabitants.

Transportation

Road transportation 
The district is covered by the following road routes:
 National Route 35, under construction.

References 

Districts of Alajuela Province
Populated places in Alajuela Province